Indian Lake Local School District also known as "Indian Lake Local Schools" is a school district comprising the northwestern part of Logan County, Ohio. The President of the Board of Education is Tracy McPherson, and the Superintendent is Dr. William McGlothlin.

External links
District Homepage

Education in Logan County, Ohio
School districts in Ohio